Madeleine McAfee (born 5 February 1993) is an Australian handball player for UTS Handball Club and on both, the Australian national team and Australia women's national beach handball team (beach handball), and participated at the 2016 Beach handball world Championships as well as the 2011 World Women's Handball Championship in Brazil and in the 2009 Women's World Championships in China.

She has also captained the Australian Junior Women's Handball Team for the championships in Spain and Italy. McAfee has also been a significant presence in the European Handball sporting club at her high school, Lourdes Hill College.

In 2015, she was part for the gold medal winning Queensland University of Technology team from the 2015 Australian University Games on the Gold Coast.

References

1993 births
Living people
Australian female handball players